The president of Italy is the head of state the Italian Republic. Since 1948, there have been 12 presidents of Italy. 

The official residence of the president is the Quirinal Palace in Rome. Among the Italian presidents, three came from Campania (all from Naples), three from Piedmont, two each from Sardinia (both from Sassari) and from Tuscany, one from Liguria, and one from Sicily. No woman has ever held the office.

Election 
The president of the Republic is elected by Parliament in a joint session of the Chamber of Deputies and the Senate. In addition, the 20 regions of Italy appoint 58 representatives as special electors. Three representatives come from each region, save for the small Aosta Valley which appoints one, so as to guarantee representation for all localities and minorities.

According to the Constitution, the election must be held in the form of secret ballot, with the 315 senators, the 630 deputies and the 58 regional representatives all voting. A two-thirds vote is required to elect on any of the first three rounds of balloting and after that a majority suffices. The election is presided over by the Speaker of the Chamber of Deputies, who calls for the public counting of the votes. The vote is held in the Palazzo Montecitorio, home of the Chamber of Deputies, which is expanded and re-configured for the event.

The president assumes office after having taken an oath before Parliament and delivering a presidential address. Presidents are elected to serve a seven-year term. Giorgio Napolitano is the first president to be elected to a second term in 2013, followed by Sergio Mattarella in 2022.

Presidents of the Italian Republic (1948–present)

Timeline

Substitute of the head of state 
The Acting President of the Republic is an office not explicitly provided for in the Italian Constitution, but deriving from the provision contained in the article 86. On various occasions, officials had to intercede in the absence of a head of state (notably in the case of a president's resignation or ill health). Only Enrico De Nicola, who was elected to be provisional head of state by the Constitutional Assembly on 28 June 1946, had an official title and took residence in the Quirinal Palace. The others took the powers, but not the title of Head of State. After the adoption of the Italian Constitution in 1948, the president of the Senate is eligible to take the powers of head of state in case of absence of the President of the Republic.

See also 
 Lists of office-holders
 King of Italy, for previous Italian heads of state between 1861 and 1946
 List of presidents of Italy by time in office
 List of prime ministers of Italy
 Politics of Italy
 Prime Minister of Italy

Notes

References

External links 
   – official site of the president of Italian Republic

Italy
Presidents
List
History of the Italian Republic

it:Presidenti della Repubblica Italiana#Elenco dei presidenti della Repubblica Italiana